The RCA Albums Collection is a 2016 box set edition of the RCA recordings of Elvis Presley.

References

2016 compilation albums
Elvis Presley compilation albums